A double referendum on a new constitution and independence took place in Western Samoa on 10 May 1961. A Constitutional Assembly of Matai and associated groups had been elected the previous year to draw up a proposed constitution. It reflected the Westminster system of parliamentary democracy, but restricted both standing and voting in elections to the Matai. The referendums were supervised by the United Nations, and with both approved, the country gained independence on 1 January the following year.

Results

New constitution

Independence

References

External links
 Plebiscite Day newsreel Archives New Zealand

Western Samoa
Referendum
Referendums in Samoa
Samoa
Constitutional referendums
May 1961 events in Oceania